Fotis Papoulis (born 22 January 1985) is a professional footballer who plays for Omonia in the Cypriot First Division. Born in Greece, he represents the Cyprus national team.

Club career

Early career 
Papoulis began his football career with Acharnaikos F.C. in the Gamma Ethniki.

He made his Super League debut in January 2010 when he signed a professional contract with Panthrakikos. He scored three goals in twelve matches in the league. 

In January 2011, he left the club, signing a six-month contract with OFI, helping them return to the Super League after the play-offs. The following year, he helped the club avoid relegation. It was a very successful season for Papoulis, as he was nominated as an MVP of the week and selected among the top 18 players in the 2011-12 Superleague season.

Apollon Limassol
In Summer 2012, Papoulis joined Cypriot club Apollon Limassol. In his first three seasons at the club, he won the Cypriot Cup, and competed in the group stage of the UEFA Europa League twice. He was also Apollon's top scorer in every one of these seasons.

In May 2016, Papoulis scored the first goal of the 2015–16 Cypriot Cup final against Omonia. His team won with a final score of 2-1, and lifted the trophy. The following season, he captained Apollon in the cup final against APOEL, and helped his team win the competition for the second consecutive season. Papoulis also played in the 2017-18 Cup final, however his team lost to AEK Larnaca, and failed to win the competition for the third time in a row.

On 2 August 2018, Papoulis scored a hat-trick in a home game against Željezničar Sarajevo, winning the match with a score of 3-1. This made him the first Greek player to score a hat-trick with a foreign club in a UEFA competition.

Omonia
In Summer 2020, Papoulis signed a two-year contract with Omonia.

Οn 4 May 2021, Papoulis scored the winning goal in a 1-0 away win against AEK Larnaca. This win mathematically confirmed Omonia to be the champions of the 2020–21 Cypriot First Division. He was Omonia's top scorer in the league, tied with Marko Šćepović and Ernest Asante at eight goals.

Papoulis was one of Omonia's most consistent players in the disappointing 2021–22 campaign. He was Omonia's top scorer across all competitions with 11 goals, including two very important goals leading up to the Cup final; against AEL in the quarter final, and against Anorthosis in the semi final. He played in the final, but was substituted after five minutes, when an early red card forced Omonia coach Neil Lennon to change his plans for the game. His team went on to win the match on penalties.

On 14 June 2022, he extended his contract with Omonia for another year.

International career
In August 2018, after many years of residence in Cyprus, Papoulis settled all the necessary documents and has acquired the Cypriot citizenship and is eligible to participate in Cyprus national football team. On 6 September 2018, he made his debut with Cyprus national football team in a 2–0 away loss against Norway for the Nations League competition.

International goals
Scores and results list Cyprus' goal tally first.

Career statistics (from 2009 onwards)

Date of last update: 10 January 2022

Honours
Apollon Limassol
 Cypriot Cup: 2012–13, 2015–16, 2016–17
 Cypriot Super Cup: 2016

Omonia
 Cypriot First Division: 2020–21
 Cypriot Cup: 2021–22
 Cypriot Super Cup: 2021

References

External links

Panthraxstats
Profile at epae.org
Profile  at Onsports.gr

1985 births
Living people
Cypriot footballers
Cyprus international footballers
Greek emigrants to Cyprus
Greek expatriate footballers
Association football midfielders
Super League Greece players
Football League (Greece) players
Cypriot First Division players
Acharnaikos F.C. players
Panachaiki F.C. players
PAS Lamia 1964 players
Panthrakikos F.C. players
OFI Crete F.C. players
Apollon Limassol FC players
AC Omonia players
Footballers from Athens
Greek footballers